Less Talk More Rokk (The Remixes) is a 2007 remix EP featuring remixes of Freezepop's song "Less Talk More Rokk". The EP is available in digital format and can be downloaded on music sites such as iTunes.

Track listing

References

External links 
 Freezepop.net
 https://itunes.apple.com/us/album/less-talk-more-rokk-remixes/id500717843
 https://www.discogs.com/Freezepop-Less-Talk-More-Rokk-The-Remixes-EP/master/28720
 https://play.google.com/store/music/album/Freezepop_Less_Talk_More_Rokk_The_Remixes?id=Bxohshpwnxwjhykjh2n7zqjweny&hl=en

2007 EPs
2007 remix albums
Freezepop albums
Remix EPs